The Colgate Raiders represented Colgate University in ECAC women's ice hockey. The Raiders are attempting to participate in the NCAA Frozen Four for the first time in school history.

Offseason
May 14: The Raiders have announced the hiring of Greg Fargo as the new women's head coach. Prior to Colgate, Fargo was the head coach of the Elmira women's hockey program.

Recruiting

Exhibition

Regular season

Standings

Schedule

Conference record

Roster

References

Colgate Raiders women's ice hockey seasons
2012–13 NCAA Division I women's hockey season